Anna Cappellini (born 19 February 1987) is an Italian ice dancer. With partner Luca Lanotte, she is the 2014 World champion, the 2014 European champion, the 2015 Cup of China champion and a thirteen-time medalist on the Grand Prix series, and a seven-time Italian national champion (2012–18).

Personal life 
Cappellini was born 19 February 1987 in Como, Italy. She is a member of the Polizia Penitenziaria's sports group, the Fiamme Azzurre. She has expressed interest in studying physiotherapy after her skating career is over.

In August 2014, it was announced that she was engaged to pair skater Ondřej Hotárek. The couple married on June 20, 2015, in Brescia, Italy. Their daughter Diana was born on July 2, 2021.

Early career 
Cappellini started skating at the age of three and switched to ice dance when she was 11 or 12. She skated with Federico Bassi, Luca Lombardi, and Matteo Zanni. She and Zanni placed fifth at the 2004 World Junior Championships. The next season, they won the bronze medal at the Junior Grand Prix Final but had to withdraw from the 2005 Junior Worlds after the original dance due to Zanni's food poisoning. Their partnership ended after his father was severely injured in a car accident and he decided to stop competing.

Partnership with Lanotte

2005–06 to 2008–09 
Cappellini was partnered with Lanotte in May 2005 by the Italian skating federation. Following a strong season together on the junior circuit, Cappellini/Lanotte made their senior debut in 2006–07. They finished 8th at their first Europeans. Before their next event, Worlds, Cappellini suffered a torn labrum in her left shoulder. In the free dance at Worlds, they fell during a lift and finished 13th.

In 2007–08, Cappellini/Lanotte won their first Grand Prix medal, a silver at Skate Canada, moved up to seventh at Europeans, and finished in the top ten at Worlds.

In 2008–09, Cappellini/Lanotte did not medal in either of their Grand Prix appearances, but moved up to 5th at Europeans and were again tenth at Worlds. In the off-season, they decided to change coaches, and moved to Lyon, France, to train with Muriel Boucher-Zazoui and Romain Haguenauer.

2009–10 season 
Cappellini/Lanotte had a strong start in 2009–10, winning silver medals at the Cup of Russia and Skate America and qualifying for their first Grand Prix Final, where they finished fifth. They then placed sixth at the European Championships, and finished outside the top ten at their first Olympics. They then finished 11th at the 2010 World Championships; in the free dance, the two collided during the twizzle sequence, causing Cappellini to fall, and received low levels on several elements.

2010–11 
Cappellini/Lanotte began the 2010–11 season at the Nebelhorn Trophy. They were first in the short dance and fourth in the free dance, finishing in second place overall. They then placed fifth at the 2010 NHK Trophy, after which they decided to leave coach Muriel Zazoui and move back to Milan to train with Paola Mezzadri. They withdrew from 2010 Skate America in order to prepare a new free dance. Cappellini/Lanotte later missed Italian nationals and the European Championships because Lanotte had a knee injury. In 2011, they began splitting their time between Milan and Nikolai Morozov in Novogorsk, Russia. They returned to competition at the Mont Blanc Trophy, which they won. They finished 8th at the 2011 World Championships.

2011–12 
Cappellini/Lanotte won bronze medals at 2011 Skate Canada International and the 2011 Trophee Eric Bompard. After winning their first national title, they came in sixth at the 2012 World Championships.

2012–13 
In June 2012, Cappellini/Lanotte began training with Igor Shpilband in Novi, Michigan. Paola Mezzadri in Milan remained their primary coach, while Novi became their second training base. Cappellini sprained her left shoulder during the summer. In July, they decided to change their planned free dance.

Cappellini/Lanotte began the 2012–13 season with silver at the 2012 Finlandia Trophy. Winning silver at both of their Grand Prix events, the 2012 Skate Canada and the 2012 Trophée Eric Bompard, they qualified for their second Grand Prix Final, where they came in fourth. Cappellini/Lanotte won their first European medal, bronze, at the 2013 European Championships. They then placed fourth at the 2013 World Championships in London, Ontario.

2013–14 season 
In the 2013–14 season, Cappellini/Lanotte were awarded another pair of silver medals on the Grand Prix series. They placed sixth at the Grand Prix Final before winning gold at the 2014 European Championships in Budapest. The duo finished sixth at the 2014 Winter Olympics in Sochi. Cappellini/Lanotte ended their season at the 2014 World Championships in Saitama, Japan. Ranked first in the short dance and fourth in the free dance, they ended the competition in first overall, 0.02 of a point ahead of Canada's Kaitlyn Weaver / Andrew Poje and 0.06 ahead of France's Nathalie Pechalat / Fabian Bourzat. They became the second Italian ice dancers to win the World title.

2014–15 season 
In July 2014, Cappellini/Lanotte began working with Marina Zueva in Canton, Michigan, in addition to Mezzadri in Milan. For the 2014-15 Grand Prix season, they were assigned to Cup of China and Trophée Éric Bompard. They withdrew from Trophée Bompard to make changes to their programs. The team took silver at the 2015 European Championships in Stockholm, behind France's Gabriella Papadakis / Guillaume Cizeron. They capped off their season with a fourth-place finish at the 2015 World Championships in Shanghai.

2015–16 season 
Cappellini/Lanotte began the 2015–16 season by winning the Lombardia Trophy. They won their first Grand Prix gold at the 2015 Cup of China, followed by a silver at 2015 Rostelecom Cup. They qualified for the Grand Prix Final where they won the bronze medal behind Americans Madison Chock/Evan Bates.

Cappellini/Lanotte won silver at the 2016 European Championships in Bratislava, Slovakia, finishing second to Papadakis/Cizeron. At the 2016 World Championships in Boston, they placed sixth in the short dance, fourth in the free, and fourth overall.

2016-17 season 
Cappellini/Lanotte began their 2016-17 season by winning the CS Nebelhorn Trophy. Their Grand Prix assignments were Skate Canada and the NHK Trophy. They finished fourth at Skate Canada and won the bronze medal at NHK behind Papadakis/Cizeron.

Cappellini/Lanotte won the silver medal at the 2017 European Championships behind Papadakis/Cizeron. They went on to win the Bavarian Open before finishing sixth at the 2017 World Championships to finish their season.

2017-18 season 
To begin their 2017-18 season, Cappellini/Lanotte won gold at the 2017 CS Minsk-Arena Ice Star. For their Grand Prix series, they were assigned the NHK Trophy and Skate America. Cappellini/Lanotte won bronze at NHK behind Americans Madison Hubbell / Zachary Donahue. They went on to win silver at Skate America behind Americans Maia Shibutani / Alex Shibutani. They qualified for the Grand Prix Final where they finished in sixth place.

At the 2018 European Championships, Cappellini/Lanotte finished fourth overall after winning bronze in the short dance and placing fifth in the free dance. At the 2018 Winter Olympics, Cappellini/Lanotte competed in the team event where Team Italy finished fourth behind Team USA. In the individual event, Cappellini/Lanotte placed fifth in the short dance and sixth in the free dance to give them a sixth place finish overall.

Programs

With Lanotte

With Zanni

With Lombardi

Competitive highlights 
GP: Grand Prix; CS: Challenger Series; JGP: Junior Grand Prix

With Lanotte

With Zanni

With Lombardi

Detailed results

With Lanotte

 CD = Compulsory Dance; OD = Original Dance; FD = Free Dance.
 SD = Short Dance.

References

External links 

 
 Anna Cappellini at Fiamme Azzurre
 Cappellini/Lanotte

Italian female ice dancers
1987 births
Sportspeople from Como
Living people
Medalists at the 2007 Winter Universiade
Figure skaters at the 2007 Winter Universiade
Figure skaters at the 2010 Winter Olympics
Figure skaters at the 2014 Winter Olympics
Figure skaters at the 2018 Winter Olympics
Olympic figure skaters of Italy
Figure skaters of Fiamme Azzurre
European Figure Skating Championships medalists
Universiade medalists in figure skating
Universiade gold medalists for Italy
World Figure Skating Championships medalists
Fantasy on Ice main cast members